Shanagarry is a village in east County Cork in Ireland.

Shanagarry is known for the Ballymaloe Cookery School, in the home and gardens of celebrity chef Darina Allen. Also resident here is Darina's daughter-in-law Rachel Allen, another well known chef.

Shanagarry Castle passed to the family of William Penn in the 1660s; it was his occasional residence before he left for Pennsylvania and started his Holy Experiment. Also to be found in Shanagarry is the historic Old Road, an ancient Irish causeway and home to the original residents of the village.

Shanagarry is also the home village of the Russell Rovers hurling and football teams. The teams are made up of people from Shanagarry, Ballycotton and Churchtown South.

Surrounding area
About  from Shanagarry, just off the road to Ballycotton, lies Ballynamona beach. The surrounding land is a sanctuary for wildlife and is home to herons, oystercatchers and whitethroats. There are views of Ballycotton Bay from the beach.

See also 
List of towns and villages in Ireland

References

External links
Stephen Pearce Pottery
Ballymaloe Cookery School
Ballymaloe House

Towns and villages in County Cork